Chris le Bihan (born May 27, 1977 in Grande Prairie, Alberta) is a Canadian bobsledder who has competed since 2004. He won a bronze medal in the four-man event at the 2010 Winter Olympics in Vancouver.
Bihan's best finish at the FIBT World Championships was fourth in the mixed team event at Lake Placid, New York in 2009.

He won the World Cup four-man event at Park City, Utah on 14 November 2009.

References
 Chris Le Bihan at the Canadian Olympic Committee
 

1977 births
Bobsledders at the 2010 Winter Olympics
Canadian male bobsledders
Living people
Medalists at the 2010 Winter Olympics
Olympic bobsledders of Canada
Olympic bronze medalists for Canada
Olympic medalists in bobsleigh
People from Grande Prairie
Sportspeople from Alberta